The following highways are numbered 544:

Canada
Alberta Highway 544

India
 National Highway 544 (India)

United States